This is a list of films based on classical mythology (Greek and Roman mythology).

Amazons

Atlantis

Centaurs

Hercules / Heracles

Italian film series
The Sword-and-sandal series (1957-1965) includes numerous films depicting Hercules that go by various titles depending by country of release. Below is a list (chronological order) that begins with the film's U.S.-release title, followed by the original Italian title and translation:

Other Hercules-related films

TV series

Sons of Hercules
Sons of Hercules was a syndicated television show that aired in the US in the 1960s. The series repackaged 14 Italian sword-and-sandal films by giving them a memorable theme song and a standard intro relating the lead character in each film to the Greek demigod Hercules any way they could. The first title listed for each film was its American television title, followed by the original Italian title in parentheses:

Homer and Troy

Aeneas

Odysseus/Ulysses

Jason and the Argonauts

Oedipus

Orpheus

Perseus

Pygmalion

Roman Kingdom and Romulus & Remus

Sirens and harpies

Theseus and the Minotaur of Crete

The Titans and Prometheus

Twelve Olympians / Dii Consentes

Ursus
Ursus is a super-human pseudo-Biblical/Roman character who is the hero in a series of Italian films made in the 1960s.  
There were a total of 9 Italian sword-and-sandal films that featured Ursus as the main character, as follows:

See also
 Swords-and-sandals
 Lists of movie source material
 List of films based on Greek drama
 List of films based on Germanic mythology
 List of films based on Slavic mythology
 List of films set in ancient Greece
 List of films set in ancient Rome
 List of films set in ancient Egypt

References

Notes

Citations

Ancient Rome-related lists

Greek mythology-related lists
Classical mythology